Bidens cosmoides, commonly known as the cosmosflower beggarticks, is a species of flowering plant in the sunflower family. This particular member of the genus Bidens is far larger than its relatives and is pollinated by birds.

Unlike its smaller relatives, collectively called kokoolau or kookoolau in the Hawaiian language, B. cosmoides is so conspicuous and distinct that it was given a distinct name by the locals: poola nui ("grand poola"). This refers to the fact that the leaves and habitus of B. cosmoides somewhat resemble the poola (Claoxylon sandwicense) but unlike that plant, poola nui bears spectacular yellow flowers.

This plant is found only along the island's Mohihi Trail. It is threatened by habitat loss due to the spread of invasive weeds and brushfires. It has also been adversely affected by the disappearance of Hawaiian honeycreeper species that pollinate it.

References

External links

cosmoides
Endemic flora of Hawaii
Endangered plants
Plants described in 1861
Taxonomy articles created by Polbot